Scioto Furnace is an unincorporated community in western Bloom Township, Scioto County, Ohio, United States.  It has a post office with the ZIP code 45677.  It lies along State Route 140.

History
A post office called Scioto Furnace has been in operation since 1862. The community's namesake Scioto Furnace was a blast furnace which was in operation from 1828 until 1892.

References

Unincorporated communities in Ohio
Unincorporated communities in Scioto County, Ohio